Chongqing Baishiyi Airport, or Baishiyi Air Base, is a People's Liberation Army Air Force base and formerly the main civil airport serving Chongqing, China, located about  northwest of the city center. It reverted to military use after the opening of Chongqing Jiangbei International Airport on 21 January 1990.

History
During War of Resistance/World War II, the airport was known as Peishiyi (Paishihyi) Airfield (Wades-Gile)/Baishiyi (Standard Pinyin), and was the Chinese Air Force base for the 4th Pursuit Group composed primarily of Polikarpov I-15 and I-16 fighter squadrons assigned for the defense of then-wartime capital of Chongqing; an I-15bis fighter of 21st PS, 4th PG piloted by Maj. Liu Zhesheng shot down a Mitsubishi Ki-21 heavy-bomber over Bashiyi air base on 6 June 1940. The airport was then used by the United States Army Air Forces Fourteenth Air Force as the U.S. entered the war following the attack on Pearl Harbor. Baishiyi was a command and control base, being used late in the war as the headquarters of the 68th Composite Wing, which controlled the combat operations of the 23d Fighter Group and the 308th Bombardment Group. In addition C-47 Skytrain transport aircraft used the airport flying troops and supplies into the area as well as combat wounded to rear areas. The Americans remained at the airport after the war ended, the facility becoming the headquarters of the China Air Service Command, which supplied equipment and other logistical support to American and Chinese forces, along with being headquarters of Fourteenth Air Force. The American units began closing down in early 1946, with the last personnel of the 10th Weather Squadron departing the facility on 31 July 1946.

Former airlines and destinations 
Between 1939 and 1949, Baishiyi airport had served destinations internationally and domestically, and was the third airport ever in China to be put to operation. Before 1990, it was a primary hub for China Southwest Airlines.

Accidents and incidents 
 On the night of 18 January 1988, China Southwest Airlines flight 4146, an Ilyushin Il-18 arriving from Beijing, crashes into a terrain 5 kilometers from the airport due to an inflight fire caused by an engine fire and explodes, killing 108 of its occupants.

References

External links

 Airfields & Seaplane Anchorages China
 USAFHRA Document Search – Peishiyi

Airports in Chongqing
Defunct airports in China
Airfields of the United States Army Air Forces in China
Chinese Air Force bases
Airports established in 1936
1936 establishments in China